Polenšak is a village in the Slovene Hills in the Municipality of Dornava in northeastern Slovenia. The area is part of the traditional region of Styria. It is now included with the rest of the municipality in the Drava Statistical Region.

The parish church in the settlement is dedicated to the Visitation of the Virgin and belongs to the Roman Catholic Archdiocese of Maribor. It was built in the early 17th century.

References

External links
Polenšak on Geopedia

Populated places in the Municipality of Dornava